The discography for American industrial metal band Bile consists of the following:

Suckpump (1994 Energy)
 Head
 Burnt
 Ura Fucking Loser
 I Reject
 Feeling Like Shit
 Get Out
 Suckpump
 Get Out (Radio Edit)

RELEASED: September 8, 1994, LABEL: Energy Records FORMAT: LP INFO: "Suckpump" is now out of print. A remastered version can be found in the "Frankenhole" digipak. Written and recorded by Krztoff. Produced and engineered by Slave, Void, and Krztoff.

Teknowhore (1996 Energy)
 Intro
 Teknowhore
 Weather Control
 No One I Call Friend
 Habitual Sphere
 Compound Pressure
 Interstate Hate Song
 Green Day
 No I Don't Know
 Suckers
 Lowest Form
 You Can't Love This (Pt. 1)
 You Can't Love This (Pt. 2)
 You Can't Love This (Pt. 3)
 You Can't Love This (Pt. 4)
 Solitude Is Bliss
    
RELEASED: June 18, 1996, LABEL: Energy Records FORMAT: LP INFO: "Teknowhore" is now out of print. A remastered version can be found in the "Frankenhole" digipak. Written and recorded by Krztoff. Produced by Krztoff and Slave. Mixed by Slave. Engineered by Steve Spaperri and Patrick Gordon

The Darkbeat EP (1996 Energy)
 Planet Weather Control
 The Phantom God

RELEASED: 1996 LABEL: Energy Records FORMAT: EP INFO: "The Darkbeat EP" is a vinyl record released as a promotional item with two remixed tracks. The tracks are versions of "Weather Control" and "Lowest Form." Remixed and produced by Slave and Krztoff with assistance by Myk Amoia

Biledegradable (1997 Energy)
 My Generation
 Rubber Love
 Degradable
 Fascion (Demo)
 My Generation (Original Demo)
 The Phantom God
 Planet Weather Control

RELEASED: March 18, 1997, LABEL: Energy Records FORMAT: EP INFO: "Biledegradable" is now out of print. Tracks 6 and 7 were originally found on "The Darkbeat EP" vinyl. "My Generation" written by Peter Townshend. Produced, engineered, and mixed by Krztoff.

Sex Reflex (2000-2003 Bile Style)
 World War Four
 Betty Page
 Wet Dream
 Sex Reflex
 There Is No You and Me
 To Belong, My New Uniform
 In League
 Double Fang
 Vampyre Hunter K
 When the Dead Come Home
 It'll Never Happen to Me
 Relix
 The Hunger, The Feeding, The Afterglow
 Rock Is Dead (In Bed)
 Sex Reflex (Un-lubed, Red and Raw Mix)

RELEASED: September 23, 2003, 2000 original 3 different versions tracks are different on each version LABEL: Bile Style Records FORMAT: LP INFO: Produced, mixed, mastered, recorded, and engineered by Krztoff. "Sex Reflex" was remastered and reissued in September 2003 with alternative cover art, a remixed track, and exclusion of the track "Manchurian Candy Date."

Nightmare Before Krztoff (2000-2003 Bile Style)
 The Serial Killer Blues
 In My Eye
 Melas Chasm
 You Don't Turn Me
 Submission
 The Day the Aliens Landed
 Death Buzz Lust
 Venom On My Breath
 Extremeties
 Dr. Quogue's Methedone Reducer
 Love Stinks

RELEASED: May 16, 2000, LABEL: Bile Style Records FORMAT: LP INFO: Dubbed as Krztoff's 'solo' cd. Produced, mixed, and mastered by Krztoff during the "Sex Reflex" sessions that didn't quite fit into the Bile realm. "Love Stinks" written by Peter Wolf and Seth Justman.

Demonic Electronic (2002-2003 Bile Style)
 The Devil's Bile
 Legion
 Demonic Electronic
 Celebrity
 Prime Time Loser
 Bad Karma
 The Hatred Acid
 Buried in the Back
 Demons
 Jerk
 Clones (We're All)
 Jerk (Atkins Diet Mix)
 Celebrity (Radio Rehash)
 Say Hello
 Teknowhore (KMFDM Demo '93)

RELEASED: October 29, 2002, 2 different versions released and tracks are differenton each. LABEL: Bile Style Records FORMAT: LP INFO: "Demonic Electronic" was written, performed, produced, recorded, mixed, engineered, and mastered by Krztoff. "Clones (We're All)" written by Alice Cooper.

The Copy Machine (2002 Bile Style)
 Clones (We're All)
 Do You Wanna Touch Me There (Oh Yeah)
 We Got The Beat
 Love Stinks
 My Generation
 Mid-Life Crisis
 Scentless Apprentice
 Not to Touch the Earth
 Creep

RELEASED: October 12, 2002, LABEL: Bile Style Records FORMAT: LP INFO: A collection of Bile's cover songs. All songs recorded, mixed, and mastered by Krztoff. Tracks written by, in order: Alice Cooper, Gary Glitter, The Go-Go's, The J. Geils Band, The Who, Faith No More, Nirvana, The Doors, and Black from the Dead.

Frankenhole (2003 Bile Style)
Disc One: 
 Head
 Burnt
 Ura Fucking Loser
 I Reject
 Feeling Like Shit
 Get Out
 Suckpump
 Get Out (Radio Edit)
 Ura Fucking Loser (Radio Edit)

Disc Two:
 Intro
 Teknowhore
 Weather Control
 No One I Call Friend
 Habitual Sphere
 Compound Pressure
 Interstate Hate Song
 Green Day
 No I Don't Know
 Suckers
 Lowest Form
 You Can't Love This (Pt. 1)
 You Can't Love This (Pt. 2)
 You Can't Love This (Pt. 3)
 You Can't Love This (Pt. 4)
 Solitude Is Bliss

RELEASED: November 18, 2003, LABEL: Bile Style Records FORMAT: LP INFO: Full title: "Frankenhole - The Reanimation of Dead Tissue." This is a remastered compilation of Bile's first two albums, "Suckpump" and "Teknowhore." All songs written, recorded, mixed, mastered, and engineered by Krztoff.

Regurge: A Bucket of Bile, Best of Bile (2004 Bile Style)
 Get Out
 No One I Call Friend
 In League
 Legion
 I Reject
 Weather Control
 Wet Dream / Sex Reflex
 Jerk
 Ura Fucking Loser
 Teknowhore
 Betty Page
 The Devil's Bile
 Celebrity

RELEASED: December 10, 2004, LABEL: Bile Style Records FORMAT: LP INFO: Full title: "Regurge: A Bucket of Bile Best Of." This is a best of compilation containing all your favorite Bile tracks. All songs written, recorded, mixed, mastered, and engineered by Krztoff.

Hate Radio (2009 Bile Style)

 Like The Plague
 Take Target Out
 World Up Your Ass
 Dr. Depression
 Who the Fuck
 I Don't Need a Reason
 The Weakest One
 Whores of War
 Hate Radio
 The Late Great United States
 Your Last Minute
 The Banned After
 Danz De Bear
 The Tear in The Fabric of Time

Sharks and Covid, Vol. 1 (EP) (2021 Bile Style Records) 

 Heavy on Me
 Shark Frenzy at Brooklyn Beach
 M.H.T.D. 
 NYC Variant

RELEASED: May 5, 2021, LABEL: Bile Style Records FORMAT: Digital Download INFO: Created during and inspired by the covid-19 pandemic quarantine and multiple unreported fatal shark attacks worldwide. All instruments, programming and mixing by Christoph Liggio. Additional horns by Roger Ebner. Additional drums on "Heavy on Me" by Steve Gallo. Recorded in Brooklyn, NY and Chicago, IL.

Video
 When The Dead Come Home VHS & DVD

Motion picture soundtracks 
 Mortal Kombat featured the song "I REJECT"
 Strangeland featured the exclusive song "IN LEAGUE" (1998),  The band is also featured in the movie performing live.
 Traces of Death V (2000) featured several songs from the album Sex Reflex

Other releases
 DNA sampler Vol 1  (1995) Ura Fucking Loser
 Energy Records Sampler (1997) Rubber Love, Weather Control
 Anthems of Rust and Decay: A Tribute To Marilyn Manson (2000)  Tourniquet
 The Broken Machine: A Tribute to Nine Inch Nails (2001) Happiness in Slavery
 United: 02 - The Sound of the Underground (2002) Jerk-Marty Atkins mix
 Mutations: A Tribute to Alice Cooper (2002) Clones (we're all)
 A Tribute of the Year: Tribute to Faith No More (2002) Midlife Crisis

Discographies of American artists